Verimatrix is a company founded in 1999 which specializes in content security for digital television services internationally, providing pay television service protection technology and secure VOIP. It provides software and IP-based security through its Verimatrix Video Content Authority System (VCAS), which is most commonly used by IPTV operators.

In 2019, Verimatrix was acquired by Inside Secure. The combined company adopted the Verimatrix name.

Products
Verimatrix Video Content Authority System enables cardless revenue security for Digital Video Broadcasting, IPTV, Over-the-top content and mobile television services. Verimatrix provides threat monitoring and analytics through Verspective Intelligence Center, its cloud-based revenue security platform launched in 2015. Verimatrix also offers forensic watermarking technology.

On June 23, 2017 Verimatrix announced that they had acquired the MiriMON technology and development team from TV audience analytics company Genius Digital.

On July 9, 2019 Verimatrix announced ProtectMyApp, a web based service for mobile app developers to protect their apps from reverse engineering.

Customers

Verimatrix secures revenue for a number of video service providers. Among its 850 plus customers are Telefónica for its Movistar TV, Swisscom for its Swisscom TV 2.0 service, including Ultra HD content, and Etisalat for its eLife UHD service and OnWeb OTT service in the United Arab Emirates.

References

External links

Companies based in San Diego
Companies listed on Euronext Paris